Ellinton Antonio Costa Morais (born 30 March 1990), known as Liliu, is a Brazilian footballer who last played for FCI Levadia in the Estonian Meistriliiga.

Club career

Nõmme Kalju
On 3 July 2017, Liliu signed a contract with Estonian club Nõmme Kalju. Kalju won the 2018 Meistriliiga title with Liliu taking the league's top scorer title with 31 goals.

Brommapojkarna
On 7 August 2019, Liliu signed a contract with Swedish club Brommapojkarna. He left at the end of the year.

Honours
FCI Levadia
 Estonian Supercup: 2022

References

External links 
 
 

1990 births
Living people
Brazilian footballers
Brazilian expatriate footballers
K.V.C. Westerlo players
Hapoel Ra'anana A.F.C. players
Birkirkara F.C. players
Clube de Regatas Brasil players
Esporte Clube Rio Verde players
Ethnikos Achna FC players
Nea Salamis Famagusta FC players
Gżira United F.C. players
Nõmme Kalju FC players
IF Brommapojkarna players
FC Inter Turku players
Belgian Pro League players
Israeli Premier League players
Cypriot First Division players
Meistriliiga players
Maltese Premier League players
Superettan players
Veikkausliiga players
Association football forwards
Brazilian expatriate sportspeople in Estonia
Brazilian expatriate sportspeople in Belgium
Brazilian expatriate sportspeople in Kuwait
Brazilian expatriate sportspeople in Cyprus
Brazilian expatriate sportspeople in Israel
Brazilian expatriate sportspeople in Malta
Brazilian expatriate sportspeople in Sweden
Brazilian expatriate sportspeople in Finland
Expatriate footballers in Estonia
Expatriate footballers in Belgium
Expatriate footballers in Kuwait
Expatriate footballers in Cyprus
Expatriate footballers in Israel
Expatriate footballers in Malta
Expatriate footballers in Sweden
Expatriate footballers in Finland
Al-Nasr SC (Kuwait) players
Kuwait Premier League players
People from Bauru
Footballers from São Paulo (state)